Aastha Chaudhary is an Indian television actress known for television drama serials, she started her acting career in 2007 with a zee tv serial Saat Phere: Saloni Ka Safar and got much popularity with Babul Ka Aangann Chootey Na, Uttaran,  Aise Karo Naa Vidaa, Kesari Nandan

Personal life 
Aastha Chaudhary born on 20th July  in Alwar, Rajasthan. She did her schooling  from Alwar and then completed her engineering from  Jaipur Engineering College, Kukas. She always had a dream to be an army officer.

Web series 
Aastha played main lead "Rukhsana"  in Ullu originals web series "Assi Nabbe Poore Sau"

Television

References

External links
What is Aastha Chaudhary watching on the small screen?
 Aastha Choudhary is back! - Indya.com (Star Television Network Official Website)

People from Alwar district
Rajasthani people
Living people
Actresses in Hindi television
Year of birth missing (living people)